Psalm 111 is the 111th psalm of the Book of Psalms, beginning in English in the King James Version: "Praise ye the LORD. I will praise the LORD with my whole heart". In the slightly different numbering system used in the Greek Septuagint and Latin Vulgate translations of the Bible, this psalm is Psalm 110. In Latin, it is known as Confitebor tibi Domine. It is a psalm "in praise of the divine attributes". This psalm, along with Psalm 112, is acrostic by phrase, that is, each 7-9 syllable phrase begins with a letter of the Hebrew alphabet in order. Psalm 119 is also acrostic, with each eight-verse strophe commencing with a letter of the Hebrew alphabet in order. The Jerusalem Bible describes Psalm 112, "in praise of the virtuous", as "akin to this psalm in doctrine, style and poetic structure.

The psalm forms a regular part of Jewish, Catholic, Lutheran, Anglican and other Protestant liturgies. Musical settings include works by Heinrich Schütz in German, and Marc-Antoine Charpentier, Henri Desmarets and Giovanni Battista Pergolesi in Latin.

Text

Hebrew Bible version 
The following is the Hebrew text of Psalm 62:

King James Version 
 Praise ye the LORD. I will praise the LORD with my whole heart, in the assembly of the upright, and in the congregation.
 The works of the LORD are great, sought out of all them that have pleasure therein.
 His work is honourable and glorious: and his righteousness endureth for ever.
 He hath made his wonderful works to be remembered: the LORD is gracious and full of compassion.
 He hath given meat unto them that fear him: he will ever be mindful of his covenant.
 He hath shewed his people the power of his works, that he may give them the heritage of the heathen.
 The works of his hands are verity and judgment; all his commandments are sure.
 They stand fast for ever and ever, and are done in truth and uprightness.
 He sent redemption unto his people: he hath commanded his covenant for ever: holy and reverend is his name.
 The fear of the LORD is the beginning of wisdom: a good understanding have all they that do his commandments: his praise endureth for ever.

Uses

Judaism 
Verse 4-5 are found in the repetition of the Amidah during Rosh Hashanah.
Verse 10 is recited upon awakening following Modeh Ani and handwashing.

New Testament 
In the New Testament, Psalm 111 is quoted twice:
 Verse 9a is quoted in Luke .
 Verse 9c is quoted in Luke .

Protestantism 
This is a psalm of praise to God for:
 His great works v.2
 His enduring righteousness v.3
 His grace and compassion v.4
 His provision v.5
 Truth and Justice v.7
 Redemption for His people v.9
 Granting of wisdom to those who revere him v.10

Musical settings
Heinrich Schütz wrote a setting of Psalm 111 in German, "Ich danke dem Herrn", SWV 34, as part of Psalmen Davids, published first in 1619. He wrote a setting of a metred paraphrase of the psalm in German, "Ich will von Herzen danken Gott dem Herren", SWV 209, for the Becker Psalter, published first in 1628. Marc-Antoine Charpentier composed four settings of the psalm in Latin:
 In 1670s, grand motet "Confitebor tibi Domine", H.151, for soloists, chorus, 2 violins, and continuo
 In 1690s, grand motet "Confitebor tibi Domine", H.200 - H.200 a, for soloists, chorus, and continuo
 In 1690s, grand motet "Confitebor tibi Domine", H.220, for soloists, chorus and continuo
 Mid - 1690s, grand motet "Confitebor tibi Domine", H.225, for soloists, chorus, flutes, strings and continuo

Henri Desmarets set one grand motet lorrain of it, "Confitebor tibi Domine" in 1707. Giovanni Battista Pergolesi composed a setting, Confitebor tibi Domine in C majoy for soprano, alto, choir, strings and continuo 1732.

References

External links 

 
 
 Psalms Chapter 111 text in Hebrew and English, mechon-mamre.org
 Psalm 111 – The Greatness of God’s Works text and detailed commentary, enduringword.com
 Hallelujah! / I will praise the LORD with all my heart. text and footnotes, usccb.org United States Conference of Catholic Bishops
 Psalm 111:1 introduction and text, biblestudytools.com
 Psalm 111 / Refrain: The Lord is gracious and full of compassion. Church of England
 Psalm 111 at biblegateway.com
 Hymns for Psalm 111 hymnary.org

111